The 2001 Ohio Bobcats football team represented Ohio University during the 2001 NCAA Division I-A football season. Ohio competed as a member of the Mid-American Conference (MAC) in the East Division. The Bobcats were led by first year Brian Knorr who had previously been the defensive coordinator under Jim Grobe.  They played their home games in Peden Stadium in Athens, Ohio.

Schedule

References

Ohio
Ohio Bobcats football seasons
Ohio Bobcats football